The veneer saw is a small double-edged tool for cutting thin hardwood veneer. Its narrow curved blade facilitates precision work, and its elevated offset handle makes it possible to cut flush with a surface.

A similarly shaped tool, known as a French flush-cut saw is designed for trimming the ends of dowels, tenons, and other protrusions flush with a surface.

References 
Reader's Digest Book of Tools and Skills

Saws
Woodworking hand tools